Giuseppe Protospatario (died September 1665) was a Roman Catholic prelate who served as Bishop of Boiano (1664–1665).

Biography
On 31 March 1664, Giuseppe Protospatario was appointed by Pope Alexander VII as Bishop of Boiano. He served as Bishop of Boiano until his death on in September 1665.

References

External links and additional sources
 (for Chronology of Bishops) 
 (for Chronology of Bishops) 

1655 deaths
17th-century Italian Roman Catholic bishops
Bishops appointed by Pope Alexander VII